Romesh Gunesekera FRSL (born 1954) is a Sri Lankan-born British author, who was shortlisted for the Booker Prize for his novel Reef in 1994. He has judged a number of literary prizes and was Chair of the judges of Commonwealth Short Story Prize competition for 2015.

Life and work
Born in Colombo to a Sinhalese Christian family in 1954, Romesh Gunesekera grew up in Sri Lanka and the Philippines, where his father was a founder of the Asian Development Bank, and moved to England in 1971 and currently lives in London. His first book, Monkfish Moon, a collection of short stories reflecting the ethnic and political tensions that have threatened Sri Lanka since independence in 1948, was published in 1992, and was shortlisted for several prizes. His 1994 novel Reef was shortlisted for the Booker Prize.

Gunesekera travels widely for festivals, workshops and British Council tours. He is a member of the Advisory Board of the Asia House Festival of Asian Literature.
He is currently one of the writers-in-residence for the charity First Story. He also has a short story related to the theme of animal poaching.

He was a judge for a number of literary prizes, such as the Caine Prize for African Writing, the David Cohen Prize for Literature, the Forward Prize for Poetry and most recently the Granta 2013 list of the Best of Young British Novelists.

He chaired the board of judges of the 2015 Commonwealth Short Story Prize competition.

He has been a Guest Director at the Cheltenham Festival, an Associate Tutor at Goldsmiths College and on the Board of the Arvon Foundation. For four years, until 2013, he was on the Council of the Royal Society of Literature.

He is married with two daughters.

Bibliography

Books

Reef – 1994
The Sandglass – 1998
Heaven's Edge – 2002
The Match – 2006
The Prisoner of Paradise – 2012
Noon Tide Toll – 2013
Suncatcher – 2019

Short fiction

Awards
Asian Achievers Award for services to media, arts and culture 2015
Sri Lanka Ranjana 2005
BBC Asia Award 1998 for Achievement in Writing & Literature
Winner Premio Mondello Five Continents Asia Prize 1997 (Reef)
Winner of Yorkshire Post First Work Prize 1995 (for Reef)
Finalist Booker Prize 1994 (Reef)
Finalist Guardian Fiction Prize 1994 (for Reef)
Finalist Commonwealth Writers' Regional Prize 1993 (for Monkfish Moon)
Finalist David Higham Prize 1992 (for Monkfish Moon)
Arts Council Writers' Bursary 1991
First prize in the Peterloo Open Poetry Competition in 1988
The Rathborne Prize in Philosophy 1976
Liverpool College Poetry Prize 1972

References

External links

 
 
 Romesh Gunesekera at the Royal Society of Literature
 Biography, bibliography and critical perspective of the author at contemporarywriters.com

1954 births
Living people
20th-century British novelists
21st-century British novelists
British male novelists
English people of Sri Lankan descent
Fellows of the Royal Society of Literature
Sri Lanka Ranajana
Sri Lankan novelists
The New Yorker people
20th-century British male writers
21st-century British male writers